Wayne Desmond Grady (born 26 July 1957) is an Australian professional golfer.

Early life 
Born in Brisbane, Grady turned professional in 1978.

Professional career 
Grady began his career on the PGA Tour of Australia. He had much early success, winning the 1978 CBA West Lakes Classic. He also played extensively on the European Tour during this era, winning the 1984 German Open.

Shortly thereafter, Grady earned membership on the PGA Tour at 1984 PGA Tour Qualifying School. In 1989, Grady won the Westchester Classic. However, Grady is probably best known for his 1990 PGA Championship victory where he defeated Fred Couples down the stretch. He was also runner-up at the 1989 Open Championship, losing with fellow Australian Greg Norman in a playoff to American Mark Calcavecchia.

As of 2005 Grady is director of the PGA Tour of Australasia. He owns a golf course design business and a golf tour company, and has worked as a commentator for the BBC's televised golf coverage since 2000.

Professional wins (10)

PGA Tour wins (2)

PGA Tour playoff record (1–1)

European Tour wins (2)

European Tour playoff record (0–1)

PGA Tour of Australasia wins (3)

PGA Tour of Australasia playoff record (1–3)

Other wins (2)
1989 World Cup of Golf (team, with Peter Fowler)
1993 Indonesia PGA Championship

Other senior wins (2)
2007 Handa Australian Senior Open
2008 Handa Australian Senior Open

Playoff record
Japan Golf Tour playoff record (0–1)

Major championships

Wins (1)

Results timeline

CUT = missed the halfway cut (3rd round cut in 1983 Open Championship)
"T" indicates a tie for a place.

Summary

Most consecutive cuts made – 6 (1991 U.S. Open – 1992 Open Championship)
Longest streak of top-10s – 1 (three times)

Team appearances
Amateur
Australian Men's Interstate Teams Matches (representing Queensland): 1977

Professional
World Cup (representing Australia): 1978, 1983, 1989
Four Tours World Championship (representing Australasia): 1985, 1989, 1990 (winners)
Dunhill Cup (representing Australia): 1989, 1990, 1991
Alfred Dunhill Challenge (representing Australasia): 1995

See also
1984 PGA Tour Qualifying School graduates
List of men's major championships winning golfers

Notes

References

External links

Australian male golfers
PGA Tour of Australasia golfers
European Tour golfers
PGA Tour golfers
PGA Tour Champions golfers
Winners of men's major golf championships
Golf writers and broadcasters
Golfers from Brisbane
Sportsmen from Queensland
1957 births
Living people